The Grigna is a mountain massif in the province of Lecco,  Lombardy, northern Italy, with an elevation of . It is part of the Bergamo Alps, and it has two peaks, Grignone or Grigna settentrionale, the higher, and the lower Grignetta or Grigna meridionale (2,177 m).

Geography and climbing routes 
To the southwest, the Grigna massif descends precipitously toward an arm of Lake Como known as 'Ramo di Lecco' (The Branch of Lecco). To the east, the mountain rises gently through fields and forested land into Valsassina. The northern side of the mountain, which is known for its many caves and crevices, leads to Passo del Cainallo and the town of Esino Lario.

The easiest route to the Grignone peak is from the southeast starting at the town of Ballabio in Valsassina. Farther up the valley is Pasturo, another traditional trailhead for the ascent. The mountain's relative isolation affords it panoramic views of Alps toward the north and on clear days, the Milan cathedral can be seen to the southwest.

The Rifugio Brioschi (a mountain hut with food and accommodations) sits on the Grignone peak and is open most of the year. There are other shelters lower down on the massif, including Rifugio Bietti, Rifugio Arnaldo Bogani, Rifugio Pialeral, and Rifugio Rosalba.

Every year in September, Grigna hosts a Skyrunning event known as the "Trofeo Scaccabarozzi", which starts and finishes in Pasturo. The route passes over Grigna Meridionale and Grigna Settrionale and covers a distance of 43 km.

Sergio “Gigi” Sala from Casatenovo was the first person to reach the summit using only his hands and without any protections  in 1988.

References

External links
 Official website of the Grigna Regional Park 

Mountains of Lombardy
Mountains of the Alps